Harpalus viridicupreus is a species of ground beetle in the subfamily Harpalinae. It was described by Reiche in 1843.

References

viridicupreus
Beetles described in 1843